Ven. Edward Wix (1802–1866) was an English clergyman best known as an Anglican missionary in Canada.

Early life
Edward Wix was the eldest son of Samuel Wix (1771-1861), a noted controversialist and high churchman, and his wife Frances Walford (1781-1851). Edward Wix was educated at the Merchant Taylors’ School in London. He graduated from Trinity College, Oxford with a B.A. in 1824, and was ordained as a priest in 1825.

In Nova Scotia
Wix served in the Diocese of Nova Scotia under Bishop John Inglis, initially as the Bishop's chaplain. According to the records of the Society for the Propagation of the Gospel (S.P.G.), Wix was in Halifax from 1826 to 1830, although he traveled to England in 1828, where he recovered from typhus, married and completed his M.A..  He became Archdeacon of Newfoundland in 1830, arriving in St. John's on June 18 of that year.

In Newfoundland
Wix first went to Newfoundland with Bishop John Inglis in 1827 in his role as the Bishop's chaplain. H. W. LeMessurier, in a short history of St. Thomas Church, St. John's, describes him as an "indefatigable Missionary." Bishop Feild, in his 1848 Journal, had also described Wix as "indefatigable".

Wix frequently travelled around Newfoundland as part of his duties as a missionary, and reached southern Labrador in 1831. His best known missionary journey is recounted in his book Six Months of a Newfoundland Missionary's Journal from February to August, 1835.

Wix was also much occupied with fundraising, road-building, education, and the other social and political issues of his time. He was responsible for the construction of St. Thomas' Anglican Church in St. John's, Newfoundland, and was credited with persuading the Church of England to create the Diocese of Newfoundland and Bermuda, and to appoint the first Bishop, Aubrey George Spencer, in 1839.

Wix abruptly left Newfoundland in 1838 following accusations of wrongdoing.  Aside from a few short periods working as a curate in the London area, Wix spent the rest of his life as an invalid. He and his wife lived in different places, moving to their son's parish in Swanmore shortly before Edward Wix died in 1866.

Family
Wix married Fanny Browne (1809-1884) during his trip to England in 1828. The couple had two children born in Halifax (Fanny Wix (1829-1832) and Richard Hooker Wix (1831-1831))  and two in St. John's (Richard Hooker Edward Wix (1831-1893) and Mary Poynder Wix (1833-1833)). Only Richard Hooker Edward Wix survived to adulthood. He became a priest like his father and grandfather, and was the first rector of St. Michael and All Angels, Swanmore, Ryde. He was a noted ritualist and part of the Oxford Movement.

Evaluations
Archdeacon Edward Wix's presence in Newfoundland and Labrador had a lasting effect in unlikely places. In 1848 the Bishop of Newfoundland, sailing on the Hawk, visited the Venison Islands (Labrador) and made the following entry into his journal.

Again in 1849

Both entries in Bishop Feild's journal place Archdeacon Wix in Venison Islands, Labrador.
Edward Jesse in  Anecdotes of Dogs, 1883, recounts a story told about the Archdeacon's Newfoundland dog.

Writings
 A Retrospect of the Operations of the Society for the Propagation of the Gospel in North America
 Six Months of a Newfoundland Missionary’s Journal 1836
 A Sermon: II Kings 2:19-22

Notes

1802 births
1866 deaths
Archdeacons
Alumni of Trinity College, Oxford
19th-century English Anglican priests
English Anglican missionaries
Anglican missionaries in Canada